Raianderson da Costa Morais (born 26 August 1995), commonly known as Careca, is a Brazilian professional footballer who plays as an attacking midfielder for Malaysia Super League club Negeri Sembilan.

Club career

Perak
On 10 May 2019, Careca signed a contract with Malaysian club Perak.

References

External links
 

1995 births
Living people
Brazilian footballers
Association football midfielders
Brazilian expatriate footballers
Expatriate footballers in Malaysia
Malaysia Super League players
Perak F.C. players
People from Rio Branco, Acre
Sportspeople from Acre (state)